Artur Surenovych Ayvazyan (born 14 January 1973) is an Olympic shooter for Ukraine and Russia who won a gold medal in the 50 metre rifle prone event at the 2008 Summer Olympics in Beijing.

Born in Armenia, Ayvazyan took up shooting in 1985 and moved to Ukraine in 1990, when he competed in his first major international tournament as a junior. He won one medal as a junior, in 1993, before moving up to the senior division in 1994. He moved to Simferopol in 1997 to train with a new coach and captured his first ISSF World Cup victory the following year. As of 2012 he has participated in every edition of the Olympics since 2000 and has won six World and seven European Championship medals in individual and team events, including his junior bronze from 1993. In 2014 he began competing for Russia.

Early life
Ayvazyan was born on 14 January 1973 in Yerevan, the capital of Armenia, then part of the Soviet Union. He took up sport shooting in 1985 and moved to Lviv in what is now Ukraine in 1990, after his parents were unable to pay the bribe to get him into the Armenian State Institute of Physical Culture. There he entered a local infantry school and participated in his first major international tournament, the European Junior Championships in Arnhem, Netherlands, where he placed 4th in the 10 metre air rifle event. He next appeared at the European Junior Championships 1993 in Brno, Czech Republic, where he won a bronze medal in the 50 metre rifle three positions competition and finished eighth in both the 10 metre air rifle and the 50 metre rifle prone categories.

International career
Ayvazyan entered his first senior European Shooting Championship in 1994, in Strasbourg, France, placing 26th in the 10 metre air rifle division. He also participated in the World Championships for the first time, in Milan, Italy, with a best placing of 12th in the 50 metre rifle three positions competition among four events. He finished with double digits rankings over the next three years of European Championships before finding a new coach and moving to Simferopol in 1997. His results improved in 1998 and he earned his first ISSF World Cup victory and placed fourth in the World Championships in Barcelona, Spain and the World Cup Final, all in the 50 metre rifle three positions category. He continued his success in the discipline by winning a bronze medal at the 1999 European Shooting Championships in Bordeaux, France and then participated in the 2000 Summer Olympics, where he finished 5th, 8th, and 30th in the 50 metre rifle three positions, 10 metre air rifle, and 50 metre rifle prone divisions respectively.

Ayvazyan first reached the podium at a World Cup Final in 2001, finishing third in the 50 metre rifle three positions event. It was the first and, as of 2012, only year that he received an individual European Championship crown, after winning in the same discipline at the tournament in Zagreb, Croatia. He won a silver medal at the 2003 European Championships in the 50 metre rifle prone competition in Plzeň, Czech Republic in the lead up to the 2004 Summer Olympics, where he placed 7th, 9th, and 22nd in the 50 metre rifle three positions, 50 metre rifle prone, and 10 metre air rifle categories respectively. In 2005 he won a bronze medal at the European Championships held in Belgrade, Serbia in the 50 metre rifle prone division.

In 2008, upon returning from a World Cup event in Munich, Germany, Ayvazyan was detained by Ukrainian customs for having an unregistered gun and was placed under suspicion of weapons smuggling. Half of the team was called in for questioning and, after going through two courts and losing significant training time during their final preparations for the 2008 Summer Olympics, it was eventually determined that the guns were all legally registered and that the evidence suggesting otherwise was planted in an attempt to discredit the head coach. At the Games, Ayvazyan won the gold medal in the 50 metre rifle prone event, in addition to finishing 19th and 21st in the 50 metre rifle three positions and 10 metre air rifle competitions respectively. His Olympic victory not his only podium finish that year: he won his fifth, and as of 2012 most recent, World Cup event in the 50 metre rifle three positions discipline and placed second in the division at the World Cup Final, his highest ranking in the tournament as of 2012.

Ayvazyan won a silver medal in the 10 metre air rifle category at a 2009 World Cup event the last time, as of 2012, that he finished on the podium as an individual at a major international tournament. He competed at the 2012 Summer Olympics, finishing 10th, 19th, and 21st in the 50 metre rifle three positions, 10 metre air rifle, and 50 metre rifle prone disciplines respectively. It was the first time in his four appearances that he had failed to make the final of any Olympic competition. As of 2012 he has thirteen individual World Cup podium finishes, five of which are first-place rankings, and four individual World Cup Final medals. In team events he has been World Champion in 1998, runner-up in 1998, and bronze medalist in 2002 and 2010 in the 50 metre rifle three positions category and World Champion in 1994 and runner-up in 2002 in the 50 metre rifle prone competition. He was also European Champion in both divisions in 1999. Living in Crimea, he took up Russian citizenship in 2014 and began competing internationally for that country.

Olympic results

References

1973 births
Living people
Sportspeople from Yerevan
Ukrainian male sport shooters
Shooters at the 2000 Summer Olympics
Shooters at the 2004 Summer Olympics
Shooters at the 2008 Summer Olympics
Shooters at the 2012 Summer Olympics
Olympic shooters of Ukraine
Olympic gold medalists for Ukraine
Ukrainian people of Armenian descent
Olympic medalists in shooting
Medalists at the 2008 Summer Olympics
Russian male sport shooters
Ukrainian emigrants to Russia
Naturalised citizens of Russia